Branstone is a hamlet on the Isle of Wight, off the south coast of England. According to the Post Office the population of the hamlet at the 2011 Census was included in the civil parish of Newchurch.

The hamlet lies on the A3056 road, near to the larger settlement of Sandown. Branstone Farm Studies Centre was established in 1973 to give younger children an opportunity to sample life on a working farm.
Branstone was a small village community in the 18th century  and was the site of the first co-operative shop on the Island; being part of the Shanklin, Lake and Branstone Cooperative Union. The shop is now part of two private houses, called Headley House and Headley Grange.

References

Hamlets on the Isle of Wight